Lodge Manufacturing Company is an American manufacturer of cast iron cookware based in South Pittsburg, Tennessee. Founded in 1896 by Joseph Lodge, Lodge Manufacturing is one of America's oldest cookware companies in continuous operation. It is still owned and managed by the descendants of the Lodge family. Most cast iron sold by Lodge is produced in its foundry in South Pittsburg, which has been in operation since the company was founded.

History

Founded in 1896 by Joseph Lodge, Lodge Manufacturing is one of America's oldest cookware companies in continuous operation. Joseph Lodge and his wife settled in South Pittsburg, Tennessee, a town of 3,000 people along the Tennessee River beside the Cumberland Plateau. The Lodge Manufacturing Company has operated continuously in the same location ever since, and holds the title of being the oldest cast iron cookware manufacturer in the US. 

In the late 1950s-1965 Lodge transferred its molding and casting process to a revolutionary automated system.  In 1973, their iconic recognizable logo was created and is still used today. In 2002, Lodge became the first cast iron cookware manufacturer to season their equipment in the foundry. in 2013, Lodge started their carbon steel cookware line making high quality carbon cookware.   Lodge introduced a line of enameled cast iron equipment in 2005; this was to match the ability of European manufacturers' abilities. In 2017, Lodge opened their second foundry, increasing their manufacturing capacity by 75%. In July 2019, Lodge unveiled seven new cast iron cookware products under the label Blacklock, a new lighter gourmet line of skillets and ovens. In August 2019, Lodge announced acquisition of startup FINEX Cast Iron Cookware, previously based in Portland, Oregon.

See also 
Dutch oven
List of cast iron cookware manufacturers

References

External links
Lodge Cookware - official site
Official Twitter account for Lodge Cast Iron
Official Facebook fan page for Lodge Cast Iron

Kitchenware brands
Manufacturing companies established in 1896
Companies based in Tennessee
1896 establishments in Tennessee